Cobra is the fictional nemesis of the G.I. Joe Team in the Hasbro toylines and related media. This is an alphabetical listing of Cobra members with unique identities as well as the members of its factions.

Alexander McCullen
Alexander McCullen is Destro's long-lost son in the Devil's Due Publishing continuity and member of the Iron Grenadiers. He posed as Destro when the real one was bed-ridden with an illness.

Baroness

Bayonet
Bayonet is a Cobra Snow Serpent serving as part of the organization's elite Plague Troopers. He wears a portable life support system due to having survived injuries to his chest by the G.I. Joe team.

Big Boa
Big Boa is Cobra's trainer, and was first released as an action figure in 1987. He was meant to be as an enemy to Rocky Balboa, from the Rocky films, even coming with boxing gloves, but the Rocky character was never released as an action figure. Big Boa is a brutal, unfeeling taskmaster who whips the unruly Cobra Troopers into shape, as these soldiers are not motivated by patriotism, unit loyalty, honor, or sense of duty. Cobra Troopers say he has a voice like a bullhorn, fists the size of frozen turkeys, and the disposition of a bear with a headache.

Big Boa appears in Devil's Due G.I. Joe series. He fights Bazooka, one of four Joes who had just discovered Cobra's influence in the small town of Delhi Hills. Bazooka defeats him in hand-to-hand combat, but Big Boa, like most signs of Cobra influence, is spirited away before the authorities arrive. He also makes an appearance in issue #24. Later, Big Boa is killed along with several Cobra troopers and South American operative Asa Negra in an attack by the Red Shadows. Their bodies are discovered by Joe members Hardball, Rampart, and Glenda. Moments later, the Red Shadows kill the Joes as well. These 'Shadows' are a militia group that seeks to destroy Cobra and G.I. Joe, by slaying key members on each side.

Big Boa was also featured as a character in IDW Publishing's G.I. Joe: Cobra II.

Big Boa plays a supporting role in the second G.I. Joe novel Divide and Conquer. Along with Croc Master, he attempts to provide backup to Raptor. He also appears in the third G.I. Joe novel Fool's Gold, by S.M. Ballard. He decides to try and take over Cobra by use of a disintegration gun prototype; he is stopped by a bullet in the leg and the theft of the gun.

Big Boa was given a 25th Anniversary style figure by the G.I. Joe Collectors Club as part of their Figure Subscription Service.

Black Out
Black Out is the code name of Thomas G. Stall. He is the brother of G.I. Joe members Barrel Roll and Bombstrike, and was born in Cincinnati, Ohio. Black Out washed out as a candidate for the G.I. Joe Team, when he failed his psychological exam. Angered that his brother was accepted, Black Out joined up with the Cobra Organization as a sniper. His possible reason for being denied membership in G.I. Joe is that he might have been behind the disappearance of Bombstrike. Black Out also goes together with Firefly and Munitia as H.I.S.S. (short for Hierarchy of Infiltration, Stealth, and Sabotage).

Black Out was first released as an action figure in 2003, carded in a two-pack with Flint. In G.I. Joe: America's Elite, he served as a member of the elite Plague Troopers.

Body Bags
Body Bags is a member of Cobra's Plague Troopers. He was selected from the Range Vipers and has seamlessly fit into the unit.

Cesspool
Cesspool is the code name of Vincent D'Alleva. He was born in Newton, Massachusetts, and was first released as an action figure in 1991, as part of the Eco-Warriors line.

For a time Cesspool was the Chief Executive Officer of a company with holdings in large number of oil refineries, mills and chemical plants. In an effort to placate environmentalists, he takes some on a personal tour of one of his holdings. He suffers an accident, dropping him into chemical sludge. He acquires a scar running down the right side of his face, leaving him blind in that eye. Cesspool comes to believe that environmentalists were the cause of his misfortune. He also wishes to make the world as 'ugly and deformed' as he is. To that end, he offers his services as a businessman to Cobra.

In the Marvel Comics G.I. Joe series, he first appeared in issue #123. Continuing in the next two issues, he and his men fought the G.I. Joe "Eco-Warriors" team, made up of Clean-Sweep, Ozone and Flint. The Joes drive Cesspool off of his "plasmatox" base on an abandoned oil drilling platform, ultimately using a U.S. government lawyer to inform Cesspool that his assets have been seized. Cesspool continued to work for Cobra, ultimately operating alongside Zarana on Cobra Island. Firefly, with the aid of the Red Ninjas, captures them and holds them prisoner. Cobra Commander however, refuses to pay their ransom, and says Firefly can keep them and the island, as they are all ultimately worthless to him and his newer ventures. As revealed in issue #135, Zarana and her close ally Road Pig spent months as prisoners alongside Cesspool.

In the Devil's Due G.I. Joe series America's Elite, it is revealed Cesspool has settled down into suburbia with the help of a version of the Witness Protection Program. Scarlett stops by to grill him about suspected Cobra ties to the satellite bombing of Chicago. She finds Cesspool is dying of cancer due to past exposure to toxins. Guarding the sick Cesspool in his home is a younger woman claiming to be his wife and three robotic soldiers in the guise of children. They subdue and capture Scarlett. Sometime later, Cesspool is captured by the Joes and transferred to the Coffin prison. Cobra forces later invade the prison, freeing some while executing others considered to be "loose ends". Cesspool falls under the latter category.

Cesspool appeared in the DiC G.I. Joe animated series voiced by Terry Klassen. He also appeared as a boss in 1992's G.I. Joe: The Atlantis Factor for the Nintendo Entertainment System.

In IDW Publishing's G.I. Joe continuity, he first appears in Infestation 2: G.I. Joe #1, as a crazed resident of the "Cobra-La" installation for unfit and unstable agents deemed valuable to Cobra R&D.

Cobra Commander

Cobra Mortal
"Cobra Mortal" was first manufactured in Argentina in 1989, as part of Plastirama's 2nd series of "G.I.Joe Comandos Heroicos" line.

Cobra Mortal was released in the U.S. as an action figure as part of the 2006 Convention Set "Cobra's Most Wanted: Mercenaries". He served Cobra in South and Central America, before severing ties and becoming a mercenary, but still functions as a Cobra field operative. He appeared in the Devil's Due series G.I. Joe: America's Elite, when the Joes start hunting down every member of Cobra that they can find during "World War III".

Copperhead

Croc Master
Croc Master is a former alligator wrestler and burglar alarm salesman, who founded Guard-Gators Inc., in an effort to commercialize the use of alligators for home security. He later began to abundantly stock Cobra Island's maze-like system of shallow canals and interconnecting waterways, with ravenously hungry man-eating crocodiles, deliberately conditioning them to be hostile, psychotic and fast. He is Cobra's reptile trainer. Croc Master was first released as an action figure in 1987.

Crystal Ball
Crystal Ball is Cobra's hypnotist, and was first released as an action figure in 1987. He is the seventh son of a seventh son, born of a Romanian father (who supposedly had "second sight"), and an American mother from Bangor, Maine. Legend indicates seventh sons of seventh sons have telepathic powers. Whether this is true or not, Crystal Ball can reportedly sometimes read minds, and has been used as an interrogator of captured Joes.

Crystal Ball claims that the origins of his talents stem from the dark and mysterious power of the occult. Independent research by Psyche-Out uncovered another possible origin, tied to a theatrical hypnotist known as "Trance-Master", who operated as an encyclopedia salesman in Maine, before traveling abroad to gain new knowledge of hypnotic techniques. An unnatural spike in encyclopedia sales, combined with his sudden disappearance from the lecture circuit, corresponded with the appearance of Crystal Ball as part of Cobra. Whatever his true past, Crystal Ball has proven to be an effective Cobra agent, helping Doctor Mindbender to modify the Brainwave Scanner, and using his unusual talents to bend the will of Cobra prisoners.

In the Marvel Comics G.I. Joe series, he first appeared in G.I. Joe Special Missions #24. He assists Cobra in a failed attempt to kidnap the President of the United States from a baseball game. His skills allow them to pass through the Joe-provided security with minimal violence. His hypnosis of various people is undone by Cover Girl.

In the Devil's Due G.I. Joe series, Crystal Ball spends some time masquerading as Dr. Scott Stevens, who is a therapist working with General Philip Rey. He eventually reveals that General Rey is a clone of Serpentor, and is part of a larger conspiracy to interject General Rey into the G.I. Joe team. Crystal Ball uses post-hypnotic phrases to unlock Rey's mind and turn him into a fully functioning Cobra agent. But the plan backfires, and with Duke's help, General Rey is able to combat his initial programming and break free from Crystal Ball's control. Crystal Ball is then taken into G.I. Joe custody.

He later appears in the first issue of the Devil's Due Storm Shadow series. He is working with the Night Creepers, whose business conflicts with the ninja's efforts. He also appears in a dream sequence in a Devil's Due Special Missions one-shot.

Crystal Ball is a supporting character in the G.I. Joe novel Divide and Conquer. In it, he has telepathy, and is capable of projecting long-range illusions. The non-fiction book Haunted Heart: The Life and Times of Stephen King indicates that Stephen King's son, Owen, had a hand in creating the Crystal Ball character. The figure is mentioned by name in King's novel, The Tommyknockers.

Darklon
Darklon is a distant cousin of the Destro clan and ruler of Darklonia. He briefly led the Iron Grenadiers when Destro retired from frontline conflict. Thought killed when Cobra Commander expanded operations into Eastern Europe and launched a missile that destroyed Darklon's castle, but in reality he escaped the blast and was alive and well until captured by the G.I. Joe team in the continued G.I. Joe: A Real American Hero comic, issue #171 by IDW publishing.

Decimator
Decimator was first released as an action figure in 1990, as the driver of the Cobra "Hammerhead" vehicle.

Decimator has a knack for technology that involves hand-eye coordination. He wears a special helmet that gives a special view of the enemy target. The helmet gives excellent night vision ability and a 180° view. This technology enables him to keep the target in continuous view without having to turn his head around.

Destro

Dice
Dice is a Cobra ninja, and was first released as an action figure in 1992, as part of the Ninja Force line. Dice often works with Slice, another ninja.

In the Marvel Comics G.I. Joe series, he first appeared in issue #120. There he is summoned to Destro's castle in Trans-Carpathia. Dice becomes involved with the "Red Ninja" clan. Both Dice and Slice become mentally affected by the ninja Firefly, and work to free him from a predicament on Cobra Island. Dice appears in issue #138, working with various Cobra operatives, such as Dr. Biggles-Jones, to hunt down suspected Cobra traitors Destro and the Baroness. The latter two escape.

Dice appeared in the DiC G.I. Joe animated series voiced by Scott McNeil.

Doctor Biggles-Jones
Doctor Biggles-Jones is a fictional character from the G.I. Joe: A Real American Hero and Transformers Marvel Comics series.

Her first appearance is in G.I. Joe: A Real American Hero #135, when her scientific facility is attacked by the mercenary Night Creepers. She and her railgun are taken, and except for the Doctor, all inside are killed. She then works closely with the seeming Joe traitor Scarlett in Destro's Trans-Carpathian castle. Biggles-Jones leads the hunt for Destro and the Baroness, who were hiding from Cobra Commander in the castle. She also teams up with the Cobra ninjas Slice and Dice.

After the alien robot Megatron shows up at the castle, he makes a deal with Cobra Commander to trade Cybertronian technology, for a re-designed body and the railgun taken by Cobra. Biggles-Jones designs Megatron's shoulder-mounted electromagnetic railgun and other enhancements, including his new tank-based alternate mode. Biggles-Jones however cares about the welfare of the recently injured Scarlett, knowing her to be an undercover agent for G.I. Joe. As such, she becomes uncomfortable with Cobra Commander's deal with the powerful Megatron. Cobra betrays Biggles-Jones and offers her to Megatron as part of the deal. Megatron arranges to freeze her brain for transport to Cybertron, but Scarlett, paying back a debt for Biggles-Jones saving her life, confronts Megatron to save her. Scarlett's bold challenge allows a squad of Autobots to intercept Megatron and free Biggles-Jones. Meanwhile, the Joes smuggle the deactivated Aerialbot Skydive aboard the Ark. Having witnessed the nobility of the Autobots, the scientist willingly surrenders to Megatron, who reclaims her and stows her aboard the Ark before departing.

In Transformers: Generation 2, it was revealed that Spike Witwicky sneaked onto the Ark during Megatron's battle with Cobra. On the Ark, Spike finds his Headmaster body, Fortress Maximus where he left him (in Marvel's Transformers #79). Fortress Maximus battles Megatron, allowing Skydive to free Biggles-Jones and take her back to G.I. Joe.

In G.I. Joe Special Missions: Antarctica, Dr. Biggles-Jones is mentioned to have been found in a Cobra medical facility. She is listed in G.I. Joe: America's Elite as terminated by Cobra during a raid on "The Coffin", G.I. Joe's maximum security prison.

Doctor Mindbender

Doctor Venom

Firefly

Gallows
Gallows was a former Cobra Saw Viper who was promoted to the elite Plague Troopers. He is able to fire with a marksman's accuracy and reload very quickly. Gallows was released as an action figure in 2006, as part of the "Plague Troopers vs Steel Brigade" set.

General Mayhem
General Mayhem is a former Spetsnaz general who went AWOL. Returned as General Mayhem and Destro's new general of the Iron Grenadiers. His plans may seem chaotic and unorganized, but they usually come together to ensure victory.

There is a rumor that General Iron Bear and General Mayhem are one and the same was dispelled by David S. Lane under his alias "Commander_Lane" on the official GI. Joe Club Forum. "I need to weigh in, since my name is erroneously included in that wiki entry. I want to clarify that whom ever posted those entries added false information. The Oktober Guard Leader: General Iron Bear and the Iron Grenadiers Infantry Commander: General Mayhem are not the same character.

Ghost Bear
Ghost Bear is the code name of Jesse Kwinn Jr. and is the son of Tracker Kwinn. He was released as an action figure in 2004, packaged with the Cobra Pulverizer battle suit, as part of the Valor vs Venom line. Ghost Bear was born in an Inuit village on the Russian side of the Bering Strait. He has learned how to hunt and track in the most unforgiving environment on Earth. When his father Tracker Kwinn was killed by the Cobra Organization during a mission with G.I. Joe, Ghost Bear joined up with the Cobra Organization, where he developed a grudge against the G.I. Joe Team, including Snake Eyes.

He appeared in the Devil's Due series G.I. Joe: America's Elite, when the Joes start hunting down every member of Cobra that they can find during "World War III".

Grim Skull
Grim Skull was a former Sand Viper who got promoted to the elite Plague Troopers. He successfully completed a mission to bring back an experimental mutagen after the lab techs escaped with their research and materials by mutating his own men to earn the promotion. Grim Skull was released as an action figure in 2006, as part of the "Plague Troopers vs Steel Brigade" set.

Gristle
Gristle is the code name of Danimal J. Rogers, and he is Cobra's urban crime commander. His birthplace is Montego Bay, Jamaica, and he was first released as an action figure in 1993, as part of the Battle Corps line. In Brazil he is released as 'Vandalo'.

Gristle is noted for having little sense of personal hygiene, and the sunglasses he wears to cover his blood-shot eyes. He spent months training to join the group known as the "Headhunters". He also spent time as the "right hand man" to crime lords, who operated illegal warehouses disguised as legit comedy clubs. Gristle allied himself with Cobra after starting his own gang. He has self-confessed to feeling "crazy" when pursued by G.I. Joe.

Gristle appeared in the DiC G.I. Joe animated series, voiced by Garry Chalk.

In IDW Publishing's G.I. Joe continuity, he first appears in Infestation 2: G.I. Joe #1, as a crazed resident of the "Cobra-La" installation for unfit and unstable agents deemed valuable to Cobra R&D.

Guillotine
Guillotine is a former Navy SEAL who defected to Cobra, because he felt the SEALs were not ruthless enough. He became a Cobra Eel, quickly rising in rank due to his ruthlessness. Cobra Commander personally selected him to lead the elite Plague Troopers. He designed the Plague training program and selected the unit's members. Guillotine was released as an action figure in 2006, as part of the "Plague Troopers vs Steel Brigade" set.

Hannibal
Hannibal was released as an action figure in 2006, as part of a comic book 3-pack, along with Agent Courtney Krieger and Spirit Iron-Knife. He first appeared in the Devil's Due G.I. Joe series, and is named for the Carthage general who fought Rome in the Second Punic War. He is a clone of Hannibal, who was created alongside Serpentor by Dr. Mindbender, using the original's DNA and aged a few years. He escaped his foster family to reunite the other Serpentor clones along with Dr. Mindbender, and served in the Coil under Serpentor, until being taken into custody after their defeat. He now serves as a general in Cobra, seeking to help Cobra Commander conquer the world. He is willing to sacrifice his own men to win a battle.

Headman
Headman is a drug kingpin who leads a criminal organization known as the Head Hunters. He was first released as an action figure in 1992, as part of the DEF (Drug Enforcement Force) line. A repaint of this figure was released in 2002 as a two-pack with General Tomahawk as part of the G.I. Joe vs. Cobra series. This second version of Headman was also released as a bonus figure with the Duke vs. Cobra Commander two-pack as part of a K-Mart exclusive.

Headman began his criminal career mugging old women for their Social Security checks. He moved on to robbing convenience stores. While in prison, he learned the basics of drug dealing. He created a drug empire based on paramilitary standards. There is strict discipline and a respected chain of command. This has proven successful; much of his competition has fallen by the wayside. He later moves much wider profit possibilities; he is known for stealing weapon plans and price art treasures.

In the Marvel comics G.I. Joe series, he appears in issue #123. His drug peddling forces come into conflict with the Joes' "Drug Enforcement Force", which includes Bullet-Proof, Mutt, and Shockwave. Headman had brought drugs into the Cobra-controlled town of Broca Beach. He also must deal with a suburban housewife out to kill him. Without realizing the nature of the town they were fighting for, the Joes drove out Headman and his forces.

He appears the Devil's Due comics in Special Missions: Brazil where he is captured by the Joes. He ends up a prison in the "Coffin", a high-security G.I. Joe operated prison in the country of Greenland. Tomax, a Cobra operative, invades the prison to rescue his brother and takes the opportunity to kill many 'loose' ends. Headman is one of the many fatalities; Dr. Biggles-Jones and Monkeywrench are also slain.

Headman appeared in the DiC G.I. Joe animated series, voiced by Scott McNeil. He is the main villain of a two-part episode "The Greatest Evil". G.I. Joe and Cobra team up to stop him. First they attack his inner city headquarters. Headman retreats to a secret base in the desert and kidnaps Falcon and the sister of Crimson Guard Immortal to use as hostages. Falcon escapes and calls his teammates for help. Joe and Cobra follow Falcon's signal and attack the desert base. eventually members of both groups face down Headman in the base's manufacturing plant where the drug kingpin tries to spray his product over them, hoping their deaths by overdose will help boost the sales of his product. The plan backfires however and Headman ends up getting sprayed instead and begins having a severe overdose. Just before succumbing, Headman sets off the self-destructive mechanism for the base. All the Joe and Cobra forces escape the base's destruction. The last scene of the episode shows Headman's arm sticking out of the rubble followed by a blank screen and the words "Drugs Kill."

In IDW Publishing's G.I. Joe continuity, he first appears (in the second ongoing G.I. Joe: Cobra series) as a right-hand man to Major Bludd, who is known and feared for decapitating his foes. His character and very appearance are a complete departure from the drug lord image from his action figure and past comic book appearances.

Hotwire
Hotwire is a Cobra scientist who specializes in robotics. He intended to break with family tradition of being mad scientists, but was kicked out of school for cybernetic experiments. Cobra recruited him to optimize their Battle Android Troopers. He sees himself as a pure scientist and is oblivious to his own insanity.

Incision
Incision, formerly Aleph, is the former leader of the Night Creepers and currently serves as a member of Cobra's Plague Troopers. A highly skilled, arrogant assassin, he serves in the Plague for money, and protection from the Night Creepers. In America's Elite #35, Storm Shadow kills Incision in battle in the Amazon.

Infrared
Infrared is a member of the elite Cobra Crimson Guard Immortal and is a member of the elite Cobra Plague Troopers.

Interrogator
Interrogator was first released as an action figure in 1991, as part of the Battle Copters line. He was also in 2006 as part of the DTC line. In 2010 he was a part of an exclusive set of figures released by the G.I. Joe Collectors Club at their annual convention.

Interrogator was used in the Devil's Due line of G.I. Joe comics. He was first mentioned in issue #30 of the regular series. Cobra Commander wanted the Joe infiltrator Barrel Roll captured and taken to the Interrogator. The Joe escaped before this could happen. In another behind the scenes appearance, Interrogator questioned Barrel Roll's brother Blackout about whether he was really switching sides from G.I. Joe to Cobra.

His first appearance came in Special Missions: the Enemy when he took part in a raid on a hospital to kidnap the child of Destro and the Baroness. This mission was a test to see if he and the others with him were worthy of joining the new elite squad known as The Plague.

Later, he kidnapped Duke and his father Max Hauser during a family visit in St. Louis. He disguises himself as an Army officer and tries to persuade Max that his son has gone AWOL and is looking for asylum. Before he can successfully deceive the elder Hauser and further torture Duke with sedatives, Roadblock comes to their rescue and the Interrogator flees. He lashes out before escaping and shoots Max Hauser, but it is barely a wound and he survives.

Later, during the "World War III" storyline, Interrogator and the other members of the Plague served on several missions around the world in eliminating various opposition to Cobra including a battle with the Joes in the Mid East and fighting resistance in Philadelphia. He eventually takes part in the final battle between Joe and Cobra in a hidden base in the Appalachian Mountains. During the battle he is knocked out by a punch to the face delivered by Duke.

Interrogator also appears in the series "Hearts and Minds" in issue #3 by IDW. Interrogator proves his skills at getting information by questioning Thomas Stall. He uses Stall's shame at being a called a coward because of a false video tape showing him running from his fellow soldiers.

Interrogator appeared in the DiC G.I. Joe animated series.

Lt. Clay Moore
Lt. Clayton W. Moore was a former street gang member who joined up with the Cobra Organization where his leadership enabled him to become a garrison officer at Cobra Headquarters. He even managed to prove himself to Cobra Commander when he managed to ferret out a "traitor" in their ranks. Cobra Commander rewarded Lt. Clay Moore with the command of the elite Cobra Shock Viper corps.

Major Bludd

Metal-Head

Metal-Head is an anti-tank specialist and member of the Iron Grenadiers.

Mistress Armada
Mistress Armada is the real name of Lilian Osborne, a former member of the British Army who sided with the Iron Grenadiers upon befriending Alexander McCullen in the Devil's Due Publishing continuity. First appearance in Image Comics G.I. Joe #1 (September 2001).

Munitia
Munitia is an unnamed female mercenary, and anyone that gets close to her gets a chill to their bone. She is often found in the company of Black Out and Firefly, known together as H.I.S.S. (Hierarchy of Infiltration, Stealth, and Sabotage). Munitia was released as an action figure in 2009, as an exclusive with the G.I. Joe Collectors' Club. In G.I. Joe: America's Elite, she served as a member of the elite Plague Troopers.

Neurotoxin
Neurotoxin is the leader of the Cobra Sand Scorpion forces, and was first released as an action figure in 2004. Like all of the Sand Scorpion troops, Neurotoxin was hand-picked from the Cobra Sand Vipers to have his DNA combined with the DNA of a scorpion to produce a more effective warrior.

Neurotoxin appears in the Devil's Due book Special Missions Manhattan. He is captured by the Joes and later sent to the Coffin prison in Greenland. He is among the prisoners freed by Tomax and later battles the Joes in Mexico.

Overkill

Overlord
Overlord is the code name of Mikhail Derenko. He was first released as an action figure in 1990, packaged with the "Dictator" attack tank/hovercraft. He is suspected of being a former Crimson Guard member. Regardless, he actually managed to take control of Cobra for some time. He advocated 'traditional Cobra values' but this was just to mask his own personal grab for power.

Overlord appeared in the Devil's Due G.I. Joe series. He is responsible for the death of Chuckles, murdering him on the beach of Cobra Island in issue #25. Moments later, Skidmark and Duke move in to arrest Overlord, but a helicopter crashes between them, killing Skidmark and allowing Overlord to escape. He later goes to work for the Jugglers, who send him to Duke's secret base in Iceland. There he mortally wounds Scanner, and locks Duke, Scarlett, and Snake Eyes in a vault. Scanner uses the last of his strength to activate the base's self-destruct, killing himself and Overlord.

Overlord appeared as a boss in the 1991 G.I. Joe video game for the Nintendo Entertainment System.

Raptor
Raptor is Cobra's falconer, and was first released as an action figure in 1987.

Raptor was a yuppie tax consultant who took up falconry as a pastime. He became obsessed with the avian bloodsport, and discovered that by breeding bigger and stronger birds, and equipping them with steel-tipped talons, they were capable of attacking much more profitable game. After Destro caught him poaching on a Cobra mink ranch, Raptor joined the Cobra legions, and began work on developing a bird of prey strong enough to attack a G.I. Joe. Raptor has an unmistakable kinship with his feathered minions, and has even taken to dressing like a giant bird, in order to put his birds at ease. He supplements his income in the service of Cobra, by training his falcons to steal jewels and other valuables.

In the Marvel Comics G.I. Joe series, he first appeared in issue #59. He teams up with Cobra Commander, to attack a small group of Joes on the move after weapons testing. This group includes Tunnel Rat, who Raptor had traced through his credit cards. Raptor then tails Cobra Commander's son Billy, gaining more valuable intelligence.

Raptor was one of the few members of Cobra, who knew that Fred VII had replaced the original Cobra Commander. He divulged this information to Dr. Mindbender, bringing the Cobra scientist to the Commander's supposed burial site. There they discovered an empty grave, and that Cobra Commander was still alive. Cobra Commander returns to Cobra Island, and buries Raptor with several of his other enemies in a landlocked freighter on the island. Raptor does not survive this incident, dying from botulism after eating tainted food.

Raptor appears in the G.I. Joe novel Divide and Conquer. He also appeared in the 1991 G.I. Joe video game for the Nintendo Entertainment System.

In IDW Publishing's G.I. Joe continuity, he first appears in Infestation 2: G.I. Joe #1, as a crazed resident of the "Cobra-La" installation for unfit and unstable agents deemed valuable to Cobra R&D.

Razorclaw
Razorclaw is the leader of the Cobra Razor Troopers, and was first released as an action figure in 2004 as part of the Valor vs Venom line, in a two-pack with Heavy Duty.

Razorclaw doesn't know the name he had before his transformation into a Cobra Feral Berserker. After the procedure, he had the urge to rip anything in front of him. Razorclaw was trained by renegade ninjas in vicious and sneaky tactics that have been outlawed by various ninja clans for hundreds of years. Razorclaw is simply unleashed to let the tiger DNA part of him take over to stalk and capture his prey by taking them down with his retractable claws.

In IDW Publishing's G.I. Joe continuity, he first appears in Infestation 2: G.I. Joe #1, as a crazed resident of the "Cobra-La" installation for unfit and unstable agents deemed valuable to Cobra R&D.

Repulsor
Repulsor is the code name of Frederick M. Townsend. Repulsor served as Cobra's Toxo-Viper commander, and was first released as an action figure in 2014 as a G.I. Joe Convention Exclusive.

Rip It
Rip It is the code name of Fredd T. Booth III. Rip It served as the commander of Cobra's H.I.S.S. tank division, and was first released as an action figure in 2000, packaged with the H.I.S.S. III. A version of the H.I.S.S. Commander was also released in 2007 and 2008.

He appears in the Devil's Due G.I. Joe comics, in the one-shot Special Missions: The Enemy. He takes part in a raid on a hospital to kidnap Baroness's baby. After expressing doubts about the mission, Rip It is killed by his superiors.

Roddy Piper
"Rowdy" Roddy Piper is a fellow Destro Clan member who serves as a trainer for the Iron Grenadiers. He is modeled after the professional wrestler Roddy Piper.

Scalpel
Scalpel is the code name of Andrew R. Walker. He is a doctor who joined up with the Cobra Organization as a Cobra Medic, and was first released as an action figure in 2003, in a 2-pack with G.I. Joe member Sgt. Hacker. Scalpel also has a grudge against Sgt. Hacker for reasons that he does not want to reveal.

Scar-Face
Scar-Face is a Cobra Officer, who was a courier for Cobra Commander in the Marvel Comics G.I. Joe series. He was eventually used as a "biological time-bomb", in order to infect the G.I. Joe Team with a deadly toxin invented by Doctor Venom. Scar-Face was killed, when explosive charges destroyed G.I. Joe headquarters and he was trapped inside.

Scar-Face was released as an action figure in 2008 as "Scarred Cobra Officer", in a comic book 2-pack as part of the 25th Anniversary line.

Scrap-Iron

Sergeant Major
Sergent Major is the real name of Alastair Thomas Duncan, Destro's right-hand man on the Iron Grenadiers.

Serpentor

Shadow Strike
Shadow Strike was a ninja who infiltrated the Arashikage Clan to corrupt it from within, while secretly working for Cobra Commander. He continues his training under Storm Shadow, but also spies on him for Cobra Commander. His greatest strength is also his greatest weakness, as he is a lone wolf, preferring to operate alone as opposed to teaming with another or using troops.

Shadow Strike appears in the movie G.I. Joe: Ninja Battles, in a non-speaking role.

Skull Buster
Skull Buster is Cobra's Range-Viper commander. He worked up the ranks of Cobra's Range Vipers, by being the most vicious of the bunch. Skull Buster has embraced the life of a survivalist, handling inhospitable wilderness with zeal, and cheerfully feasting on any animal worth killing. He imagines himself as the ultimate alpha predator, and is more likely to kill a scavenger such as a vulture or jackal, before dining on carrion.

During "World War III", when G.I. Joe was actively pursuing all known Cobra operatives, Skull Buster had made his home on a deserted island in the wilds of Namibia. When Shipwreck and Cover Girl show up to apprehend him, he decides to kill them by faking their deaths from exposure; simple murder would cause too much of an investigation and disrupt his "retirement". Shipwreck stuns the man with scorpion venom, and he is taken back to civilization, a fate he fears worse than death. Skull Buster is incarcerated in "The Coffin", a prison in Greenland created by G.I. Joe to hold all of their captured enemies. He is eventually freed alongside several others, during an assault on The Coffin led by Tomax.

Sky Creeper
Sky Creeper was first released as an action figure in 1991, as part of the Air Commandos line. He is the Cobra Air Recon Leader.

The criminal known as Sky Creeper created a glider to break out of reform school. He then had a career robbing patrons of rooftop restaurants and escaping via gliders. In prison, he is recruited to the side of Cobra by a member of the biker gang Dreadnoks. He then organized the "Night Vultures", a covert air recon unit, which he commands.

He appears in the Devil's Due G.I. Joe comics, in the one-shot Special Missions: The Enemy. He takes part in a raid on a hospital to kidnap Baroness's baby. After expressing doubts about the mission, Sky Creeper is killed by his superiors.

Slash
Slash is a mercenary and ninja serving in Cobra and was released in 2005. He wields twin dao broadswords. He was exiled by his clan for numerous crimes. He is described as a lethal warrior with a mantis-like grace and a complete lack of humanity. He frequently partners with Slice to form a two-person strike team.

Slash appears in the movie G.I. Joe: Ninja Battles, in a non-speaking role.

Slice

Steel Cobra
Steel Cobra (his Portuguese name is Cobra de Aço) is one of the most feared operatives of Cobra Command. He is a calculated strategist who is incredibly conceited about his success. He supervises Cobra's Python Patrol facility in the Brazilian Amazon.

Storm Shadow

Tomax and Xamot

Vanguard
Vanguard, real name Sgt. Nick Bailey, is a member of Cobra's Plague Troopers. His parents worked hard to support him and his brother, who was killed in the Black Hawk down incident, which changed his worldview to a more radical position. He was personally recruited and influenced by Cobra Commander himself.

Vapor
Vapor was first released as an action figure in 1990, packaged with the Cobra Hurricane V.T.O.L. The pilot, whose name is unknown, has direct connections between his optic nerves and his plane's targeting computers. This allows data to be directly broadcast to the inside of his helmet. This system is also linked to voice-activated weaponry. This increases his piloting skills but after about half an hour, the image processing gives him debilitating headaches and vision problems.

Vapor and the Hurricane appeared in the DiC G.I. Joe animated series. He appeared in the episode "Messenger from The Deep"

Vector
Vector is a Cobra Laser Viper serving with the organization's elite Plague Troopers. He was recruited to the Plague due to his modifying his equipment from a targeting system to an offensive laser weapon system. It is rumored Destro tried to recruit him or purchase his technology for M.A.R.S.

Velocity
Velocity is an A.V.A.C. who serves as a member of Cobra's Plague Troopers. He is equipped with a personal jetpack system. He climbed the ranks to become an A.V.A.C. and earn the right to pilot a Firebat, becoming the best pilot in Cobra, second only to Wild Weasel. He is well liked by the rest of Plague due to his friendly personality and sense of humor.

At the end of the World War III story arc, he attempts to flee before the final battle, but is shot down and killed by Black Out on Guillotine's orders.

Venomous Maximus
Venomous Maximus was first released as an action figure in 2004, as part of the Valor vs. Venom line. Cobra created him by capturing General Hawk, and mutating him into the leader of Cobra's V-Troops. He is very powerful, difficult to control, and possesses a reptilian focus, insect drive, and mammalian bloodlust.

Voltar
Voltar was a successful mercenary commander that grew too successful for his continued presence to be tolerated by the provisional governments, revolutionary councils, and military dictatorships that employed him. He is affiliated with the Iron Grenadiers as Destro's general and debuted as a toy in 1988.

Vypra
Vypra is the code name of Ann A. Conda (a play on "anaconda"). She grew up in the swamps of New Orleans before joining up with the Cobra Organization. She is the driver of the Rattler 4-WD. She is mentioned in the Devil's Due series G.I. Joe: America's Elite, when the Joes start hunting down every member of Cobra that they can find during "World War III".

Wild Weasel
Wild Weasel is an ace pilot, who served in the bush wars of South America and Africa. He has extensive knowledge of close support aircraft, ranging from jury-rigged civilian conversions, to state-of-the-art flying machines armed with laser-guided missiles and ECM pods. His speech pattern contains a characteristic sibilance that is caused by a mouth injury. He wears a red flight suit with a helmet that hides his face.

Vance Wingfield
Vance Wingfield was the leader of the Strike First militia group, which was based in Montana. An undercover operation by G.I. Joe revealed it to be a Cobra training facility, where Wingfield was plotting to detonate a nuclear warhead on Russian soil, in order to initiate World War III. This plan was thwarted by G.I. Joe, and Wingfield was presumed dead, when he was shot in the back by his wife Shary.

Later, Wingfield's son Tyler tried to follow in his footsteps, by hatching a similar plot, and attempting to spread the lethal Death Angel virus. Tyler was also stopped by G.I. Joe, and history repeated itself, as he was also shot in the back by Shary Wingfield. Vance returned soon after, using M.A.R.S. technology to pull satellites from orbit, and collide them with cities on Earth. He was stopped when taken into custody by G.I. Joe, but not before causing devastation and killing thousands of innocent civilians in Chicago and Silicon Valley.

Wraith
Wraith is the code name of Charles Halifax. He was first released as an action figure in 2008, which was available in two different variations, the standard version, and a translucent blue version demonstrating his invisibility field.

Wraith is a mercenary who doesn't work for the money...he simply wants to fight, foster chaos and kill. Using stolen technology, he acquired a stealth assault suit that makes him virtually invisible. The only flaw in the suit, is that an outline of Wraith can be seen if he moves too fast. But by then he is so close to his target, that you only get a quick, shadowy glimpse before he makes his move.

In the Devil's Due continuity, both G.I. Joe and Cobra hoped that the skilled spy and fighter would choose to join them, but in the end, Destro was the only one who discovered what Halifax truly lived for: chaos and destruction. Destro offered Halifax a chance to become near-invincible with a stolen stealth assault suit acquired from the Chinese government. The power and remarkable opportunities provided by this suit were enough to buy Halifax's loyalty...for now.

Wraith was killed by the Baroness, in her mission of revenge on all that had wronged her in the past. The Wraith suit then fell into the hands of the Red Shadows, reportedly the suit's original designers.

Zartan

See also
 List of G.I. Joe: A Real American Hero characters
 Cobra Troopers – the common soldiers in Cobra Command
 B.A.T. – the robotic soldiers of Cobra Command
 Crimson Guard
 Night Creepers
 Python Patrol

Notes

References

External links
 Cobra A-Z at JMM's G.I. Joe Comics Home Page

Lists of G.I. Joe characters
Fictional terrorists
Lists of toy characters
Lists of fictional characters by organization
Lists of comics characters
Fictional males by franchise